The Baudelaire Label is an independent record label based in Toronto, Ontario, Canada. Artists currently signed to Baudelaire include Jon-Rae and the River, Jill Barber, Andrew Rodriguez, Matthew Barber, The Diableros, and Jewish Legend.

History

Founded in 2004 by Evan Newman, who had left his post as Head of A&R/Media Relations at V2 Records Canada, The Baudelaire Label was named Best Toronto Record Label in Now Magazine in 2006. In 2007, The Baudelaire Label merged with Outside Music and Newman went to head both the Outside Music Label as well as Outside Music Management which represents Jill Barber, Sunparlour Players, The Hylozoists, and Matthew Barber.

References

External links
The Baudelaire Label on Myspace
 Outside Management Label
 The Baudelaire Label

Record labels established in 2004
Canadian independent record labels
Indie rock record labels
Companies based in Toronto